The Opouteke River (in its upper reaches called Opouteke Stream) is a river of the Northland Region of New Zealand's North Island. It flows generally east, reaching the Mangakahia River just north of Pakotai and 30 kilometres north of Dargaville.

See also
List of rivers of New Zealand

References

Rivers of the Northland Region
Rivers of New Zealand
Kaipara Harbour catchment